Shiroro Airstrip or Shiroro Airfield is an airstrip serving the village of Shiroro and the Shiroro Hydroelectric Power Station in the  Niger State of Nigeria.

See also
Transport in Nigeria
List of airports in Nigeria

References

External links
OurAirports - Shiroro
OpenStreetMap - Shiroro Airport

Airports in Nigeria
Niger State